Adi Havewala (1917 – 31 January 2001) was an Indian cyclist. He competed in the team pursuit event at the 1948 Summer Olympics.

References

External links
 

1917 births
2001 deaths
Sportspeople from Mumbai
Parsi people
Parsi people from Mumbai
Indian male cyclists
Olympic cyclists of India
Cyclists at the 1948 Summer Olympics
Place of birth missing